"Praise God" is a song by American rapper Kanye West from his tenth studio album Donda (2021). The song features vocals from fellow American rappers Travis Scott and Baby Keem. It also features additional vocals from West's late mother, Donda West, for whom the album is named. The song peaked at number 20 on the US Billboard Hot 100, alongside reaching number 10 on the US Hot R&B/Hip-Hop Songs chart and the top of the US Gospel and Christian Songs charts.

Background
The beat for "Praise God" was originally produced by 30 Roc and Zentachi in early 2020. The first version of the beat consisted of a sample of a Japanese song with a Spinz 808 pattern. At the first listening event in Atlanta, the sample was swapped out for a choir sample, and by the time of the second listening party, the drums and 808s Zen-tachi and 30 Roc added were taken out completely. Though most of the track was completely different from its original version, 30 Roc and Zen-tachi still received production credits for creating the original track that inspired the song. Japanese music producers Machiko Ryu and Kazuhiko Katō also received writing credits for writing the original song that was sampled.

KayCyy, who has writing credits on the track, talked about how the track came together in an interview with HipHopDX: 

The song appeared on numerous track listing iterations for Donda revealed by West on July 18, 2020. The song was first played by West at the first listening event for Donda on July 22, 2021. In the following listening event on August 6, the track received some changes such as more organs being added and the percussion being altered. The first version previewed on had Travis Scott doing the first verses and the hook. On the second version, West cut some of Scott's lines out to fill himself in and substituted the entire hook with himself singing it. About collaborating with West, Keem wrote on Twitter: "Ye, an Idol, an Icon. Forever grateful for the experience of a lifetime".

Composition and lyrics
Lyrically, "Praise God" sees West along with Scott and Baby Keem complimenting Jesus and what He has done for them. The song opens up with the former's late mother, Donda West, reciting an excerpt of Gwendolyn Brooks' poem, "Speech to the Young: Speech to the Progress-Toward", speaking: "Say to them, say to the down-keepers, the sun-slappers / The self-soilers, the harmony-hushers / Even if you are not ready for the day, it cannot always be night". It focuses on the people who think negatively about life, reminding them that they have a lot to be thankful for in life. The chorus sees West singing: "We gon' praise our way out the grave, dawg / Livin', speakin', praise God / Walkin' out the graveyard back to life / I serve, follow your word / See with a sight", before his mother finishes the last line of the chorus by saying, "Into the night". In the chorus, West focuses on turning his life around and putting his faith and trust in God to give what is right, which helps him see things in a more positive perspective. Scott also discusses his relationship with Christ in both of his verses. In Keem's verse, which closes the song, he raps the line: "Y'all treat your Lord and Savior like renter's insurance, you know what I mean?". He tries to call out the people that do not have belief in Christ's power until something bad happens to them, in which they rely on Him; he compares that to a person ignoring their renter's insurance until they need payment.

Personnel
Credits adapted from Tidal.

 Kanye West – vocals, songwriting, production, programming, keyboards
 Travis Scott – uncredited vocals, songwriting
 Baby Keem – uncredited vocals, songwriting
 Donda West – additional vocals
 30 Roc – production, songwriting, programming, keyboards
 Ojivolta
 Mark Williams – production, songwriting, programming, keyboards
 Raul Cubina – production, songwriting, programming, keyboards
 The Twilite Tone – co-production, songwriting
 Zentachi – co-production, songwriting
 Mike Dean – co-production
 Sloane – additional production, songwriting
 KayCyy – songwriting
 Maurizio "Irko" Sera – master engineering
 Mike Dean – master engineering
 Sean Solymar – mix engineering
 Tommy Rush – mix engineering
 Will Chason – record engineering
 Alejandro Rodriguez-Dawson – record engineering
 Devon Wilson – record engineering
 Josh Berg – record engineering
 Mikalai Skrobat – record engineering
 Roark Bailey – record engineering
 Louis Bell – vocal editing
 Patrick Hundley – vocal editing

Charts

Weekly charts

Year-end charts

Certifications

References

2021 songs
Kanye West songs
Travis Scott songs
Baby Keem songs
Songs about Jesus
Song recordings produced by Kanye West
Songs written by Kanye West
Songs written by Travis Scott
Songs written by 30 Roc